Dispute may refer to:
 an act of physical violence; combat
 Controversy
 Lawsuit
 Dispute resolution
 Dispute (credit card)
 La Dispute, a 1744 prose comedy by Pierre de Marivaux
 La Dispute (band), an American post-hardcore band
 The endless dispute, a question of arthropod morphology